is a Japanese tokusatsu television series serving as the 16th Heisei Kamen Rider Series, and 25th series overall. Riku Sanjo returns to the Kamen Rider Series to serve as Drives lead screenwriter, with Ryuta Tasaki as director. It premiered on TV Asahi and affiliate stations throughout Japan on October 5, 2014, the week following the finale of its preceding series Kamen Rider Gaim, and joining Ressha Sentai ToQger then Shuriken Sentai Ninninger in the Super Hero Time programming block, until Drive concluded on September 27, 2015. Drive is peculiar among the heroes in the Kamen Rider franchise, as his motif and main mode of transportation is a car, rather than the signature motorcycles used by his predecessors.

Story

Shinnosuke Tomari is a former elite police officer in the Metropolitan Police, who, after an event that crippled one of his colleagues, has been "demoted" into the Special Investigations Division. This division looks into the stranger happenings in the city, particularly the recent "Density Shift" events. These events, termed "Slowdown" by the public, leave people unable to move. When he is chosen by the Drive Driver and Tridoron, Shinnosuke transforms into Kamen Rider Drive and is tasked with battling the Roidmudes who plan to rise against humanity and take over the world. He is aided by Kiriko Shijima and her brother Go, who transforms into Kamen Rider Mach. Chase, a special Roidmude with a strange past who was then known as Proto Drive and later became an evil warrior known as Machine Chaser, also reassumes his Rider identity and reclaims his 'justice' to protect humanity as he transforms into Kamen Rider Chaser. However, a greater threat later appears in the form of Kiriko and Go's father, Tenjuro Banno, the scientist who created the Roidmudes, who despite having long lost his human body, revives in the form of the evil Gold Drive, intending to make use of the remaining Roidmudes in his plan to bring down the whole world at his mercy.

Production and development
The Kamen Rider Drive trademark was registered by Toei on April 17, 2014.

The series marks the first time that a Kamen Rider's main vehicle is a car rather than a motorcycle, which has been remarked upon by entertainment news as a shock and a major change from previous Kamen Rider television series.

Episodes

Films

Movie War Full Throttle

The  was released in Japanese theaters on December 13, 2014. It features a crossover with the previously aired Kamen Rider series Kamen Rider Gaim. The Kamen Rider Drive portion of the film guest stars Yūji Ayabe of the owarai duo Piece as the antagonist . The events of the movie took place between episodes 9 and 10.

The first million ticket buyers would also receive a special DVD featuring Type Zero Episode 0: Countdown to Global Freeze, one of the Secret Mission series of Drive.

Super Hero Taisen GP

 is the 2015 entry of the "Super Hero Taisen" film series, featuring the cast of Kamen Rider Drive and the appearance of Kamen Rider 3, which was originally created by Shotaro Ishinomori for the one-shot 1972 manga . Tetsuo Kurata, (Kamen Rider Black, Kamen Rider Black RX), Yuichi Nakamura (Kamen Rider Den-O), Kousei Amano, Takayuki Tsubaki, Ryoji Morimoto and Takahiro Hojo (Kamen Rider Blade), and Kento Handa (Kamen Rider 555) reprised their roles in the film, which opened in theaters on March 21, 2015. A new actor Mitsuhiro Oikawa, confirmed to perform his role as Kamen Rider 3, as well as Shuriken Sentai Ninninger cast also appeared. The events of the movie took place between Episode 22 and 23.

Surprise Future
 
) is a Summer Movie for Kamen Rider Drive. It was released in Japanese theaters on August 8, 2015, double-billed with the film for Shuriken Sentai Ninninger and featuring a new enemy Rider known as Kamen Rider Dark Drive, driving a Rider Machine labeled the "NEXTridoron", based on a real life Mercedes-AMG GT car. It also featured the first on-screen appearance of the 17th Heisei Kamen Rider: Kamen Rider Ghost, who later reappeared in two last episodes of this TV series, followed by the appearance of some Gamma Assaults and Yurusen in the final/special episode. The events of the movie took place between episodes 40 and 41, with the flashback scene in the final/special episode shown was after this movie event is over and before episode 41 starts.

Super Movie War Genesis
 
 was released in Japanese theaters on December 12, 2015. It featured a crossover between Kamen Rider Drive and Kamen Rider Ghost.

Heisei Generations

A Movie War film, titled , was released in Japan on December 10, 2016. The film features Kamen Rider Drive teaming up with Kamen Rider Ex-Aid, Kamen Rider Ghost, Kamen Rider Gaim, and Kamen Rider Wizard as they battle against a virus based on Bandai Namco Entertainment's video game character, Pac-Man. The professional wrestler Hiroshi Tanahashi was announced to be one of the main antagonists of the movie.

Kamen Rider Zi-O the Movie: Over Quartzer

 was released on July 26, 2019. The film features Go Shijima and Krim Steinbelt teaming up with Time Riders to stop Quartzers from erasing Krim's family ancestors from 1575 of the Sengoku period.

Secret Missions
The  are a series of special episodes.

 is a special DVD packaged with the January 2015 issue of the Televi-Kun magazine. It is connected to the Kamen Rider Drive portion of Movie War Full Throttle and Type Zero and features Roidmude 005. The events of the episode took place between episodes 4 and 5.
 is a special DVD given to the first million ticket buyers for Movie War Full Throttle. It serves as a prequel episode to the Kamen Rider Drive series and features Kamen Rider Proto Drive.
 is included as part of the Blu-ray releases. It comprises four episodes and features the origin of the Special Investigations Division. The events of the episode took place between episodes 22 and 23.

 is a  special. While investigating reports of counterfeit Televi-Kun magazines, Shinosuke finds himself outmatched by a Roidmude that replicates his Kamen Rider Drive Type Speed form and overpowers him. To counter the fraud Kamen Rider, Shinosuke has the Speed Shift Car remodeled to fight back as Kamen Rider Drive Type High Speed.
 is a "Hyper Battle DVD" special. It features the return of Kamen Rider Lupin, since his last appearance in Movie War Full Throttle.

Drive Saga
 is a hybrid set with the combination of V-Cinema, CD audio drama and web releases that serve as spin-offs of characters from the Kamen Rider Drive series.

 focuses on a side story of Chase as Kamen Rider Chaser. The V-Cinema was released on April 20, 2016. The events of the episode take place between Kamen Rider Drive: Surprise Future and episode 41. In addition, Minehiro Kinomoto reprised his role as Ryu Terui/Kamen Rider Accel from Kamen Rider W in a crossover with Drive. The theme song is "good bye little moon" performed by Mitsuru Matsuoka EARNEST DRIVE. It is written by Riku Sanjo, with Hidenori Ishida as director of the film.
 focuses on side stories of Go Shijima as Kamen Rider Mach and Heart, fighting as Kamen Rider Heart against a new enemy that is threatening individuals who served as models for the other Roidmudes. The V-Cinemas were released on November 16, 2016. The events of the episodes take place after the events of Kamen Rider Drive: Mach Saga and Kamen Rider Heisei Generations. The theme song is "eternity (~from SURPRISE-DRIVE)" performed by Mitsuru Matsuoka EARNEST DRIVE. It is written by Sanjo (Heart) and Keiichi Hasegawa (Mach), while Ishida directed both films.
 focuses on a side story of Go Shijima as Kamen Rider Mach. The CD audio drama was released on November 25, 2016. The events of the episode take place between Mach Saga and Kamen Rider Heart.
 focuses on a side story of Brain, becoming Kamen Rider Brain. Originally announced as an April Fool's joke in 2017, the web series comprises two episodes and was released on Toei Tokusatsu Fan Club on April 28, 2019. It is written by Riku Sanjo and directed by Kyohei Yamaguchi.

Novel
, written by Takahito Ōmori and supervised by Keiichi Hasegawa, is part of a series of spin-off novel adaptions of the Heisei Era Kamen Riders. The events of the episode take place two years after the final episode, Kamen Rider x Kamen Rider Ghost & Drive: Super Movie War Genesis, along with the final episode of Kamen Rider Ghost in 2018. The novel was released on April 20, 2016.

Video game
, a third installment of the Kamen Rider: Battride War series, was released in 2016 for the PlayStation consoles (PlayStation 3, PlayStation 4, and PlayStation Vita). It features characters from Kamen Rider Drive, Kamen Rider Ghost, characters in previous versions of the game that were included as NPCs or assistants, as well as the Shōwa era Kamen Riders.

Cast
: 
: 
, : 
: 
: 
, : 
: 
, Businessman (40): 
, : 
, : 
: 
: 
: 
: 
: 
, : 
:

Guest cast

: 
: 
: 
: HIRO (of Yasuda Dai Circus)
: 
: 
: 
: 
: 
: 
: 
: 
: 
: 
: 
: 
: 
: 
:

Theme songs
Opening theme
SURPRISE-DRIVE
Lyrics: Shoko Fujibayashi
Composition & Arrangement: tatsuo (of everset)
Artist: Mitsuru Matsuoka EARNEST DRIVE
SOPHIA's vocalist Mitsuru Matsuoka performs the series' theme song "SURPRISE-DRIVE" under the name "Mitsuru Matsuoka EARNEST DRIVE". This is his third song performed for the Kamen Rider Series, following his song "W" for the theme song of the film Kamen Rider W Forever: A to Z/The Gaia Memories of Fate and performing vocals in SOPHIA on "cod-E ~E no Angō~" for Kamen Rider W Returns. The other members of the Mitsuru Matsuoka EARNEST DRIVE band are everset's guitarist tatsuo, session bassist IKUO, and Siam Shade drummer Jun-ji (IKUO and Jun-ji are also members of BULL ZEICHEN 88).

Insert themes
"Full throttle"
Lyrics: Shoko Fujibayashi
Composition & Arrangement: tatsuo (of everset)
Artist: S.S.P.D. ~Steel Sound Police Dept~
Episodes: 13, 14, 16, 17, 19, 24, 46
"Full throttle" is the theme for Kamen Rider Mach.
"Don't lose your mind"
Lyrics: Shoko Fujibayashi
Composition & Arrangement: tatsuo (of everset)
Artist: S.S.P.D. ~Steel Sound Police Dept~
Episodes: 15, 16, 18, 30
"Don't lose your mind" is the theme for Kamen Rider Drive Type Speed.
"UNLIMITED DRIVE"
Lyrics: Shoko Fujibayashi
Composition: DJ Hurrykenn
Arrangement: Ryo (of defspiral)
Artist: Kamen Rider Girls
Episodes: 33, 34
"UNLIMITED DRIVE" is the theme for Kamen Rider Drive Type Tridoron.
"Spinning Wheel"
Lyrics: Shoko Fujibayashi
Composition & Arrangement: Shuhei Naruse
Artist: Shinosuke Tomari, Go Shijima, & Chase (Ryoma Takeuchi, Yu Inaba, & Taiko Katono)
Episodes: 36, 38, 40, 45

References

External links

Official website at TV Asahi
Official website at Toei Company

Drive Saga website

 
Drive
Japanese crime television series
2014 Japanese television series debuts
2015 Japanese television series endings
TV Asahi original programming
Androids in television
Television series about artificial intelligence